Cappuccino is the 15th studio album by Mexican pop singer Mijares. This album was released on 2004 and it has several producers. It also has the song "La noche triste" (The sad night) that was written by Reyli Barba and it was performed in a duet with the Canadian singer Gino Vannelli. There is a bonus track "Rebecca" a theme from the telenovela of the same name.

Track listing
Tracks[]:
 Besar Tu Boca
 Tatuaje
 Celos
 Señales de Amor
 Baby
 La Noche Triste (Duet with Gino Vannelli)
 Desencadena Mi Corazón (Unchain My Heart)
 Cappuccino
 Tu Figura
 Canción del Corazón
 Si Supieras
 Me Muero Sin Ti
 Rebecca (Bonus Track)

2004 albums
Manuel Mijares albums